Fodinoidea is a genus of tiger moths in the family Erebidae. The genus was described by Saalmüller in 1884 and it is strictly endemic to Madagascar.

Species and subspecies
 Fodinoidea formosa Toulgoët, 1984
 Fodinoidea pluto Toulgoët, 1961
 Fodinoidea pluto celsicola Toulgoët, 1984
 Fodinoidea pulchra Toulgoët, 1971
 Fodinoidea pupieri Toulgoët, 1972
 Fodinoidea rectifascia Collenette, 1930
 Fodinoidea staudingeri Saalmüller, 1884
 Fodinoidea staudingeri laeta Toulgoët, 1957
 Fodinoidea vectigera (Mabille, 1882)
 Fodinoidea vectigera sanguinea Toulgoët, 1984

References

External links

Spilosomina
Moth genera